John Strohm may refer to:
 John Strohm (congressman) (1793–1884), American politician
 John Strohm (musician) (born 1967), American guitarist, singer, and lawyer